Draco volans, also commonly known as the common flying dragon, is a species of lizard in the family Agamidae. The species is endemic to Southeast Asia. Like other members of genus Draco, this species has the ability to glide using winglike lateral extensions of skin called patagia.

The species is exclusively arboreal.

Description 
The body is tan in colour with dark flecks.

The patagium of the male is tan to bright orange with dark banding. The female's patagium has irregular markings rather than banding.

Habitat 
This species can be found in tropical rainforests in Southeast Asia. It is commonly found in early second growth forests, in open secondary forest, and on forest edges.

Locomotion 
The "wings" of D. volans are supported by its ribs, which form the skeleton of the patagia. However, its elongated ribs are superadded to aid forming its "wings", and not to assist respiration.

This species is considered a passive glider, or parachutist. However, previous studies have also shown that it can be considered a gliding animal. This means that it doesn't have to deal with the aerodynamic and metabolic imperatives required for active flight.

Behaviour 
Draco volans is diurnal, and is "commonly seen running along branches, displaying, and gliding".

Courtship 
The colouration of the patagia and the dewlap play key roles in the courtship of D. volans, with the males stretching out and displaying their patagia and dewlaps to get the attention of the females.

Diet 
Draco volans feeds mainly on ants, and possibly other insects like termites. A study was conducted in Eastern Mindanao, Philippines, which found that the species exclusively feeds on ants. It hunts by waiting near a tree trunk until ants come out and crawl close to its visual field; it grabs its prey without moving itself.

Reproduction 
The female common flying dragon digs a hole in the soil to serve as a nest, and lays eggs in it.

References

Further reading
Boulenger GA (1885). Catalogue of the Lizards in the British Museum (Natural History). Second Edition. Volume I. Geckonidæ, Eublepharidæ, Uroplatidæ, Pygopodidæ, Agamidaæ. London: Trustees of the British Museum (Natural History). (Taylor and Francis, printers). xii + 436 pp. + Plates I–XXXII. (Draco volans, p. 256).
Cox MJ, van Dijk PP, Nabhitabhata J, Thirakhupt K (1998). A Photographic Guide to Snakes and other Reptiles of Peninsular Malaysia, Singapore and Thailand. Sanibel Island, Florida: Ralph Curtis Books. 144 pp. . (Draco volans, p. 101).
Linnaeus C (1758). Systema naturæ per regna tria naturæ, secundum classes, ordines, genera, species, cum characteribus, differentiis, synonymis, locis. Tomus I. Editio Decima, Reformata. Stockholm: L. Salvius. 824 pp. (Draco volans, new species, pp. 199–200). (in Latin).

volans
Reptiles of the Philippines
Reptiles of Indonesia
Reptiles described in 1758
Taxa named by Carl Linnaeus